SelfMadeHero is an independent publishing house which specialises in adapting works of literature, as well as producing ground-breaking original fiction in the graphic novel medium.

SelfMadeHero's books are distributed in the U.S. by Abrams Books.

History
SelfMadeHero was founded in October 2007 by Emma Hayley, and launched with two lines: Manga Shakespeare, featuring works based on the Bard but with different settings - mainly Japan in the past and future, and Eye Classics, which are adaptations of great classic works, such as those of Poe and Kafka. In 2008 she won the UK Young Publisher of the Year at the British Book Awards.

In 2009 SelfMadeHero expanded to include graphic adaptations of Sherlock Holmes, including Hound of the Baskervilles and Study in Scarlet, and later At The Mountain of Madness and The Shadow Out of Time by H.P. Lovecraft. It also began publishing the Graphic Biography series with Johnny Cash: I See a Darkness, which has further expanded to tell the fascinating life stories of era-defining pop-culture icons such as Hunter S. Thompson and Nick Cave.

Since 2010 SelfMadeHero has been publishing original material, notably Glyn Dillon's The Nao of Brown, The Motherless Oven trilogy by Rob Davis, and LOVECRAFT by I.N.J. Culbard. In 2011 the company received the Kitschies Black Tentacle award.

Bibliography

Manga Shakespeare
The adaptations of Shakespeare's plays were made by Richard Appignanesi (who previously worked on Icon Books' Introducing... series), with the art created by UK-based manga artist who have come to prominence via Tokyopop's Rising Stars of Manga (United Kingdom & Ireland) competition, their work for Sweatdrop Studios or London manga collective Umisen Yamisen.

Eye Classics
The creators are drawn from a British comic background (in particular Nevermore) but also include screenwriters and more traditional artists.

Crime Classics
The Crime Classics line began with a set of four adaptations of the Arthur Conan Doyle stories, adapted by Ian Edginton, with art by I. N. J. Culbard:

Rachel Cooke reviewed A Study in Scarlet for The Observer and concluded:

Graphic Biography

Awards and nominations

See also
Classical Comics, another new British company producing graphic novel adaptations of great works, including some of the same Shakespeare plays
Classics Illustrated, a similar venture from the 1940s to 1960s
 Pendulum Press, a similar venture from the 1970s
 Marvel Classics Comics,  a similar venture from 1976 to 1978
Marvel Illustrated, Marvel Comics imprint adapting classic literature
Graphic Classics
The Manga Bible, an adaptation by Siku

Notes

References

External links

Comics based on fiction
Comic book publishing companies of the United Kingdom
British graphic novels
Original English-language manga
Privately held companies of the United Kingdom
2007 establishments in England
Publishing companies established in 2007